Bosea eneae is a bacterium from the genus of Bosea which was isolated from the water supply from the La Timone Hospital Centre in Marseilles in France.

References

External links
Type strain of Bosea eneae at BacDive -  the Bacterial Diversity Metadatabase

Hyphomicrobiales
Bacteria described in 2003